Moses Sumney is a Ghanaian-American singer-songwriter. His self-recorded EP, Mid-City Island, was released in 2014. He released another five-song EP in 2016, titled Lamentations. His first full-length album, Aromanticism, was released in September 2017. His second studio album, Græ, was released in 2020. Sumney has performed as an opening act for James Blake, Solange Knowles, and Sufjan Stevens.

Early life
Born in California, Sumney was raised by pastor parents, and moved with his family back to Ghana at the age of 10. He described his childhood as "Americanized" by this age and had difficulty adjusting to the culture of Ghana, especially the rural nature of his new environment. There he grew up on a goat farm in Accra and commuted by public bus to school. His family returned to Southern California when Sumney was 16, settling in Riverside.

He did not learn to play any instruments until he was older, writing a cappella music for years instead. Sumney did not perform his musical compositions publicly until he was 20.

After high school, he moved to Los Angeles in 2010 to attend the University of California, Los Angeles. He majored in creative writing and studied poetry, which helped him improve his songwriting.

Musical career
In 2014, Sumney broke into the Los Angeles music scene and caught the eye of many record labels. He said at the time it did not feel right because labels were trying to conform him into a certain image and he was still trying to discover the artist that he wanted to be. He decided to turn down these labels and move to Asheville, North Carolina. His resistance to labels is reflected in his later album, Græ.

Sumney's 2014 debut project, Mid-City Island, is a five-song EP that was self-recorded onto a four-track recorder given to him by TV on the Radio's Dave Sitek. The self-released EP was described by Pitchfork as "primarily composed of first-takes and improvisation; the music is stirring but purposefully incomplete". Sumney joined Terrible Records after the release. He considers his songs to be performance based, and that many of his recorded compositions derive from fleshing the songs out through live performance.

He has performed at venues such as the Hollywood Bowl and alongside artists such as Dirty Projectors, Junip, St. Vincent, and Local Natives. Sumney sang on the opening track of Beck's album Song Reader. On September 30, 2016, Sumney released Lamentations, an EP which featured a guest appearance from Thundercat.

Sumney's first full-length album, Aromanticism, was released on September 22, 2017 by Jagjaguwar. It received acclaim from Rolling Stone, The Guardian, and The New York Times, which also named it one of the best albums of 2017. He stumbled across the term "aromantic" when he began writing it back in 2014 and found the term resonated with him. Several songs from the album have been featured in the soundtracks of various television shows. His 2017 single "Doomed" appeared in the Season 6 finale of Netflix's Orange is the New Black, and appeared again in Westworld, Season 3, Episode 3, "The Absence of Field".  His 2017 single "Quarrel" appeared in Netflix’s Dear White People. His 2017 song "Plastic" and his 2020 song "Keeps Me Alive" both appeared in HBO's Insecure.

Sumney played himself in Season 1 episode 4 of HBO's Random Acts of Flyness. He also appeared in the movie Creed and worked on the soundtrack alongside Ludwig Görannson and Tessa Thompson.

Sumney released his second studio album, Græ, in two parts in 2020. The first part was released on February 21, 2020, and the second part was released on May 15, 2020, accompanied by a physical release of the double album. In March 2020, he released the self-directed music video "Cut Me". In May 2020, Sumney released "Bless Me" as a single from the second part of his album, Græ.

In December 2020, Sumney's single "Me in 20 Years" was featured in a special episode of the HBO drama Euphoria. Sumney contributed a cover of the Metallica song "The Unforgiven" to the charity tribute album The Metallica Blacklist, released in September 2021. On December 8, 2021, Sumney released a full-length concert film, Blackalachia, recorded over two days in the Blue Ridge Mountains. An accompanying live album, Live from Blackalachia, was released on December 10.

Awards and honors 
In 2018, Moses Sumney's self-directed music video "Quarrel" won a SXSW Film Festival Special Jury Award, and was nominated for a Camerimage award and UKMVA. In 2020, his self-directed video for "Cut Me" was nominated for a UKMVA for Best Alternative Video - International. Both of his albums have topped the year-end lists of Pitchfork, NPR, New York Times, Stereogum, and more.

Discography

Studio albums

Live albums

Extended plays

Singles

As lead artist

As featured artist

Other charted songs

Guest appearances

Filmography

Awards and nominations

References

External links 
 Official website
"Tiny Concerts at Coffee Tables Near You". The New York Times, October 20, 2014.

Living people
1991 births
African-American  male singer-songwriters
American people of Ghanaian descent
Jagjaguwar artists
Musicians from San Bernardino, California
Singers from Los Angeles
University of California, Los Angeles alumni
21st-century African-American male singers
Singer-songwriters from California